Adolfo Pinheiro is a metro station on Line 5 (Lilac) of the São Paulo Metro in the Santo Amaro district of São Paulo, Brazil.
The station was inaugurated on February 12, 2014, with limited working hours  and started working full-time on August 4, 2014

References

São Paulo Metro stations
Railway stations located underground in Brazil
Railway stations opened in 2014